is a passenger railway station located in the city of Iyo, Ehime Prefecture, Japan. It is operated by JR Shikoku and has the station number "U04".

Lines
Only Yosan Line local trains stop at the station and these ply the sectors  -  via  or  -  via the Uchiko branch. Connections with other services are needed to travel further east of Matsuyama.

Layout
The station consists of a side platform serving a single track. There is no station building, only a simple shelter for waiting passengers. A "tickets corner" (a small shelter housing an automatic ticket vending machine) is placed on the ramp which leads to the platform from the access road. A bicycle shed has been erected near the base of the ramp.

History
Japanese National Railways (JNR) opened the station as a new stop on the existing Yosan Line on 1 November 1986. With the privatization of JNR on 1 April 1987, control of the station passed to JR Shikoku.

Surrounding area
 Japan National Route 56
Torinoki Housing Complex

See also
 List of railway stations in Japan

References

External links
 Station timetable

Railway stations in Ehime Prefecture
Railway stations in Japan opened in 1986
Iyo, Ehime